Zlonice is a market town in Kladno District in the Central Bohemian Region of the Czech Republic. It has about 2,300 inhabitants.

Administrative parts
Villages of Břešťany, Lisovice, Tmáň and Vyšínek are administrative parts of Zlonice.

Geography

History

The first written mention of Zlonice is from 1318. It was a settlement on a trade route. The first written mention of the fortress in Zlonice is from 1576. In the 17th century, the fortress was rebuilt into a Renaissance castle.

The village of Vyšínek is first mentioned in 1263, Břešťany in 1282, Tmáň in 1382, and Lisovice at the beginning of the 14th century.

Transport
Zlonice lies on a railway line from Louny to Kralupy nad Vltavou.

Sights

The Church of the Assumption of the Virgin Mary is the landmark of the town square. There was originally a Gothic church, but it was replaced by the current Baroque church, which was built in 1727–1744 according to the design by František Maxmilián Kaňka.

Zlonice Castle is originally a Renaissance castle, which was completely rebuilt in the mid-19th century. It has a Neoclassical façade. Today it houses apartments and offices.

The former Baroque hospital building houses the Memorial of Antonín Dvořák, who lived in Zlonice in 1853–1856. It is a museum that focuses on the life of Dvořák, on the market town's musical tradition and on regional history.

In Lisovice is a small railway museum.

Notable people
Wenzel Krumpholz (1750–1817), mandolin and violin player
Antonín Dvořák (1841–1904), composer; lived here in 1853–1856 and nicknamed his Symphony No. 1 The Bells of Zlonice

References

External link

Market towns in the Czech Republic
Populated places in Kladno District